The Salutation Inn is a pub in Ham, Berkeley, Gloucestershire, England.

It was CAMRA's National Pub of the Year for 2014.

References

External links

Pubs in Gloucestershire